Wenceslao Ernesto Fernández Donayre (born August 14, 1979 in Lima, Perú) is a Peruvian footballer who plays as full back and currently plays for Defensor San Alejandro.

Club career
Wenceslao Fernández started his playing career with Alianza Lima. He has also played for the clubs Sport Boys and Universidad San Martín de Porres. In his second season with Universidad San Martín, Fernández helped his club win the Torneo Apertura and finish as champions in the 2007 Torneo Descentralizado. In 2008, he joined Sporting Cristal.

International career
He has made six appearances for the Peru national football team.

Honours

Club
Universidad San Martín
 Torneo Apertura: 2007
 Peruvian First Division: 2007

References

External links

1979 births
Living people
Footballers from Lima
Association football fullbacks
Peruvian footballers
Peru international footballers
Club Alianza Lima footballers
Sport Boys footballers
Club Deportivo Universidad de San Martín de Porres players
Sporting Cristal footballers
Unión Comercio footballers
Peruvian Primera División players